In the Fishtank 5  is a 1999 EP by Tortoise with The Ex as part of the In the Fishtank project.

Reception

Heather Phares of Allmusic gave the album a mixed review, writing that the "six-song EP [...] sometimes blends the bands' divergent styles into a harmonious hybrid, and other times falls victim to stylistic clashes." He particularly singled out the track "Central Heating" as a "noisy, acquired taste". Mark Richardson of Pitchfork called the pairing of the bands "a little odd" and the resulting album "strange and probably pointless in the long run", but wrote that it "does make for a relatively intriguing listen." He noted that "on the bulk of the EP, it seems as though the Ex side of the equation presides."

Track listing
 "The Lawn of the Limp" – 4:03
 "Pooh Song (Christopher Robin's Nightbear)" – 4:57
 "Central Heating" – 2:19
 "Pleasure as Usual" – 5:03
 "Did You Comb?" – 2:09
 "Huge Hidden Spaces" – 4:12

References

External links
Konkurrent

1999 EPs
05
Tortoise (band) albums
The Ex (band) albums
Split EPs
Konkurrent EPs